The Snow Queen is a Soviet 1967 fantasy film, directed by Gennadi Kazansky and based on the eponymous 1844 fairy tale by Hans Christian Andersen.

Plot
On a frosty winter evening, the Snow Queen kidnaps Kai and turns his heart into a piece of ice. Gerda, wishing to return Kai home goes to search for him. She experiences many trials to get to the Snow Queen's palace and to retrieve Kai from icy captivity.

Cast 
 Valery Nikitenko – The Storyteller
 Elena Proklova – Gerda
 Slava Ziupa – Kay
 Evgenia Melnikova – Grandmother
 Natalia Klimova – The Snow Queen
 Nikolai Boyarsky – Counselor
 Yevgeny Leonov – King Eric XXIX
 Irina Gubanova – The Princess
 George Korolchuk – Prince
 Olga Viklandt – The Chieftain
 Era Ziganshina – The Little Robber
 Andrei Kostrichkin – Ghost
 Vera Titova – Inkwell

See also
 The Snow Queen (1957 film)
 Frozen (2013 film) Disney film inspired by The Snow Queen

References

External links 
 

Films based on works by Evgeny Shvarts
1960s Russian-language films
Lenfilm films
Russian children's fantasy films
Soviet fantasy films
Films based on The Snow Queen
1966 films
Films directed by Gennadi Kazansky
Soviet children's films